Pacific Coast School is an alternate public secondary school located in Prince Rupert, British Columbia.  The school serves students from grades 9-12.  The school is run by School District 52 Prince Rupert.

References

High schools in British Columbia
Education in Prince Rupert, British Columbia
Educational institutions in Canada with year of establishment missing